Bad Blood in the City: The Piety Street Sessions is an album by American guitarist James Blood Ulmer recorded in New Orleans at the Piety Street Recording Studios and released on the Hyena label in 2007.

Reception
The Allmusic review by Thom Jurek states, "The creative place Blood finds himself in his partnership with Reid is yielding great fruit. This album is the strongest of their collaborations thus far, and is a wild ride through blues, R&B, and hard-driving distorted and feedback-laced — yet utterly musical — New Orleans funk. It's a monster".

Track listing
All compositions by James Blood Ulmer except as indicated
 "Survivors of the Hurricane" - 3:53  
 "Sad Days, Lonely Nights" (Junior Kimbrough) – 5:59  
 "Katrina" – 3:46  
 "Let's Talk About Jesus" – 4:19  
 "This Land Is Nobody's Land" (John Lee Hooker) – 5:18  
 "Dead Presidents" (Willie Dixon, William R. Emerson) – 4:40  
 "Commit a Crime" (Chester Burnett) – 5:21  
 "Grinnin' in Your Face" (Eddie J. House Jr.) – 4:36  
 "There Is Power in the Blues" – 2:28  
 "Backwater Blues" (Traditional) – 5:52  
 "Old Slave Master" – 2:36 
Recorded at Piety Street Studios, New Orleans in 2006

Personnel
James Blood Ulmer - guitar, vocals
Vernon Reid - electric guitar, acoustic guitar
Charles Burnham - violin, mandolin 
Leon Gruenbaum - Fender Rhodes, piano, Hammond B3 organ, keyboards, mellotron, clarinet
David Barnes - harmonica
Mark Peterson - electric bass, double bass 
Aubrey Dayle - drums, percussion
Irene Datcher - vocals (track 4)

References

Hyena Records albums
James Blood Ulmer albums
2007 albums